The American Commission to Negotiate Peace, successor to The Inquiry, participated in the peace negotiations at the Treaty of Versailles from January 18 to December 9, 1919. Frank Lyon Polk headed the commission in 1919. The peace conference was superseded by the Council of Ambassadors (1920–1931), which was organized to deal with various political questions regarding the implementation of provisions of the Treaty, after the end of World War I. Members of the commission appointed by President Woodrow Wilson included:
Clive Day, an American college professor and writer on economics history at the University of California.
Donald Paige Frary, an American college professor with Yale University, an expert on International Affairs, and author; served as a secretary to Edward M. House.
Edward M. House, a diplomat, politician and presidential foreign policy advisor to President Wilson.
Vance C. McCormick, an American politician and prominent businessman from Harrisburg, Pennsylvania.
Sidney Edward Mezes, an American philosopher and college professor, former president of the City College of New York.
Charles Seymour, an American college professor at Yale University.
William Linn Westermann, then a professor at the University of Wisconsin, who later taught at Cornell and Columbia and became president of the American Historical Association.  At the conference, Westermann advised on policy regarding the Near East.
George Louis Beer, colonial historian and Chief of the Colonial Division.
Robert Lansing
Charles Pelot Summerall

See also
Paris Peace Conference, 1919

References

External links
 Records of the American Commission to Negotiate Peace in the National Archives

Aftermath of World War I in the United States
Treaty of Versailles
1919 in law
1919 in international relations